Follow through or follow thru may refer to:

 Follow through (cricket), sport term
 "Follow Through (song)", a 2003 pop/soft rock music song and single (2005) by Gavin DeGraw originally on his album Chariot
 Follow Thru (musical), 1929 musical comedy
 Follow Thru, 1930 film based on the musical

Other
 Barium follow-through, medical imaging
 Small bowel follow-through, medical imaging
 Figure-eight follow through, knot
 Follow Through (project), a US government educational experiment

See also
 
 
 Follow (disambiguation)
 Through/thru, in grammar syntax, an adposition (type of preposition)